also known as Sweet Slave Scandal!,is a Japanese manga series written and illustrated by Sakurako Hanafubuki and published by Houbunsha. It is licensed in North America by Digital Manga Publishing, which released the manga on March 25, 2008. It comprises four volumes, the first called Junior Escort, the second called Love Code, the third called Crazy Star, and last, a prequel called Shining Moon.

Reception

Comic Book Bin said that Junior Escort "refuses to be ordinary", and is a "spicy yaoi manga". Leroy Dessaroux appreciated the author getting inside one of the lead's heads more.

References

Manga anthologies
Yaoi anime and manga
Digital Manga Publishing titles
Houbunsha manga